The Rafik Hariri University Hospital (RHUH) – formerly known as Beirut Governmental University Hospital (BGUH) – is the largest Lebanese public hospital, located on the outskirts of southern Beirut. The hospital's main building has a maximal capacity of 544 hospital beds; it comprises a total of seven floors with three annex buildings a 50 bed hotel and four villas hosting staff dormitories, outpatient clinics and administrative services. The hospital is affiliated with the Lebanese University.

History
On February 2, 1979, the Lebanese government decided to build a governmental hospital with a 500-bed capacity on a publicly owned property in Bir Hassan, Beirut. The decision was based on technical studies made by the minister of Health and the Minister of Public Works and Transportation.
Due to the advent of the Lebanese civil war, which significantly weakened the public health care sector, the construction project had to be postponed until 1995 when then prime minister Rafik Hariri laid the cornerstone; construction was  finalized during 2000.
The hospital was inaugurated on August 2, 2004 with a cost of 121 million US dollars.

Controversy
The RHUH staff went on strikes on various occasions due to the repetitive delay in receiving their financial dues, the staff expressed consternation since the hospital's administration did not provide consistent causality for the delay in payment of their salaries which has been occurring for over a year since 2010.
The hospital staff also complained that the hospital administration withdrew many benefits such as the social security school grants and withholds health insurance bills from its employees.

References

External links
Rafik Hariri University Hospital

2004 establishments in Lebanon
Hospital buildings completed in 2000
Hospitals in Lebanon
Lebanese University